Charles Paine was a politician.

Charles Paine may also refer to:

Charles C. Paine (1824–1907), American politician
Charles Jackson Paine (1833–1916), American railroad executive, soldier, and yachtsman
Charles Hamilton Paine, partner in Paine Webber asset management

See also
Charles Payne (disambiguation)